Flower is the sixth album by American pop singer Jody Watley, released in 1998 and her first for Atlantic Records.

Track listing

Personnel

Jody Watley – vocals, background vocals
Marlon Williams – guitar
Neil Steubenhaus, Gene Perez – bass
John Scarpulla – tenor saxophone 
Peter Daou – keyboards
Derrick Edmondson, Jamey Jaz – keyboards, drum programming
John Robinson, Cornelius Mims – drums
Bryce Wilson – keyboards, drum programming
Michael Thompson, Arthur White – guitar
Greg Phillinganes – piano

John Wheeler – trombone
Phil Galdston – keyboards
Rakim – rap vocals on "Off the Hook" (D-Dot Remix)
Tony Kadleck – trumpet 
Patrick Morgan – viola
Darryl Brown – bass guitar
Vidal Davis – drums
Ken Lewis – guitar
Audrey Wheeler, Naimeh Heath, Cindy Mizelle, Lua Crofts, Paulette McWilliams, Dwayne Wiggins, Cassandra Lucas, Latina Webb, Stephani Alexander – backing vocals

Production
Producer – Derrick Edmondson, Phil Galdston, Masters at Work, Malik Pendleton, D' Wayne Wiggins, Bryce Wilson
Executive producers – Rich Christina, Darren Higman, Craig Kallman, Jody Watley
Arranger – Phil Galdston

Charts

Singles

References

External links

Jody Watley albums
1998 albums
Atlantic Records albums